Västerås SK Bandy is the men's bandy side of the Swedish sports club Västerås SK, located in Västerås. The senior side currently plays in the Swedish Elitserien, the top division of Swedish bandy.

Västerås SK BK Dam is the women's bandy side of the Swedish sports club, Västerås SK, which is located in Västerås. This article deals with the men's team.

Västerås SK plays at the ABB Arena South and have won the World Cup seven times. The women's side is Västerås SK BK Dam. The current coach of the senior side is Michael Carlsson, a former player for VSK Bandy and the national team.

History
The club was founded on 29 January 1904.

In the first year of bandy league system in Sweden, 1930–31, Västerås entered in Division 1 Norra together with
AIK, Hammarby IF, IF Vesta, IFK Rättvik, IK Sirius, Skutskärs IF, and SK Tirfing and finished 2nd.

On 19 March 2016, the club won its 20th Swedish national championship title by defeating Villa Lidköping BK, 5–2, in the final game. The 21st title came on 18 March 2023, by defeating Villa Lidköping BK, 3–2 following overtime, in the final game.

Squad

Honours

Domestic
 Swedish National Champions:
 Winners (21): 1923, 1924, 1926, 1942, 1943, 1948, 1950, 1960, 1973, 1989, 1990, 1993, 1994, 1996, 1998, 1999, 2001, 2009, 2015, 2016, 2023
 Runners-up (16): 1922, 1925, 1927, 1929, 1932, 1935, 1936, 1944, 1946, 1947, 1959, 1978, 1991, 1997, 2002, 2014
 Swedish Cup Champions:
 Winners (2): 2015, 2018

International
 World Cup:
 Winners (7): 1987, 1989, 1994, 1997, 2000, 2014, 2016
 Runners-up (3): 1980, 2005, 2007
 European Cup:
 Winners (5): 1990, 1993, 1994, 1996, 1998

See also
Västerås SK (disambiguation)

References

External links
Official website
Bandysidan.nu, reference site

 
Bandy clubs in Sweden
Sport in Västmanland County
1904 establishments in Sweden
Bandy clubs established in 1904